The sweetflag spreadwing (Lestes forcipatus) is a species of damselfly in the family Lestidae, the spreadwings. It is native to North America, especially eastern parts of Canada and the United States.

Identification 
This is a medium-sized spreadwing, measuring about 38 to 50 millimeters in length. The male has a dark or black thorax with tan or bluish sides and with pale stripes across the shoulders. The abdomen is dark with a light gray tip. The body is pruinescent, especially in older specimens. The female is thicker in build with a dark to black body. Both sexes may have a light brown spot on the underside of the thorax.

This species is difficult to distinguish from the common spreadwing (L. disjunctus).

Biology
This species lives near ponds, marshes, and slow-running streams.

References

External links
  NatureServe.org: Lestes forcipatus — NatureServe Explorer. Version 7.1.

Lestes
Odonata of North America
Insects of Canada
Insects of the United States
Fauna of the Eastern United States
Insects described in 1842